Metallaxis teledapa is a species of moth of the family Geometridae. It is found in northern Madagascar.

References

	

Rhodostrophiini
Moths described in 1932
Moths of Madagascar
Moths of Africa